Shilou Town is a town located within Fangshan District, Beijing, China. It borders Chengguan Subdistrict in its north, Doudian Town in its east, Liulihe and Hangcunhe Towns in its south, and Zhoukoudian Town in its northwest. As of 2020, it had 32,131 people residing under its administration.

History

Administrative divisions 

In the year of 2021, Shilou Town was subdivided into 13 divisions, including 1 residential community and 12 villages:

See also 
 List of township-level divisions of Beijing

References 

Fangshan District
Towns in Beijing